Trichodes umbellatarum is a beetle species of checkered beetles belonging to the family Cleridae, subfamily Clerinae. It can be found in France, Portugal, Spain, Balearic Islands, and North Africa.

References

umbellatarum
Beetles described in 1795
Beetles of Europe